Wang Wei-wen (born 16 December 1986) is a Taiwanese swimmer, who specialized in breaststroke events. He represented the Chinese Taipei national team in two editions of the Olympic Games (2004 and 2008), and has won a career total of eight gold medals in national and regional meets across Taiwan.

Wang made his own swimming history, as a 17-year-old teen, at the 2004 Summer Olympics in Athens, where he competed in the men's 200 m breaststroke. Swimming in heat one, Wang trailed throughout the race behind Bradley Ally of Barbados, and Miguel Molina of the Philippines to come home powerfully to third and forty-second overall with a time of 2:20.65.

At the 2008 Summer Olympics in Beijing, Wang swam in the second heat of the 200 m breaststroke event, against six other competitors, including his former rival Molina. Wang struggled to maintain his crawl and pace in the entire race, but was able to finish it in last place, with a time of 2:17.20. Wang, however, failed to advance into the semi-finals, as he placed forty-ninth overall in the prelims.

References

External links
SINA Sports Profile 
NBC 2008 Olympics profile

1986 births
Living people
Taiwanese male swimmers
Olympic swimmers of Taiwan
Swimmers at the 2004 Summer Olympics
Swimmers at the 2008 Summer Olympics
Taiwanese male breaststroke swimmers
Sportspeople from Taipei
Swimmers at the 2006 Asian Games
Asian Games competitors for Chinese Taipei
20th-century Taiwanese people
21st-century Taiwanese people